Cuphodes lechriotoma is a moth of the family Gracillariidae. It is known from Queensland, Australia.

References

Cuphodes
Moths described in 1913